During the French Revolutionary War  Trompeuse, meaning “misleading” or “deceptive”,  was a popular name for French naval vessels, privateers, and even merchant vessels. Warships of the Royal Navy captured or destroyed  at least four vessels under that name. 
 On 12 January 1794, the post ship  captured the 18-gun French Navy brig , which the Royal Navy took into service under her own name.
 In May 1797 , under the command of Captain Michael Seymour, captured the French schooner Trompeuse of six guns and 40 men. Trompeuse, of Morlaix, had been out five days and had taken two Prussian vessels, one sailing to Liverpool and the other to  Oporto.
 On 9 June 1801 the schooner HMS Gozo (misspelled as Gogo), captured the chasse maree Trompeuse, which was sailing to Ancona.

See also

Citations

References
Norie, J. W. (1842) The naval gazetteer, biographer and chronologist; containing a history of the late wars from ... 1793 to ... 1801; and from ... 1803 to 1815, and continued, as to the biographical part to the present time. (London, C. Wilson).

Captured ships
Privateer ships of France